Stephen Scott Kernahan (born 1 September 1963) is a former Australian rules footballer who played for the Carlton Football Club in the Australian Football League (AFL) and for the Glenelg Football Club in the South Australian National Football League (SANFL). He also played 16 State of Origin games for South Australia and gained selection as an All-Australian five times (1983, 1986, 1988, 1992 and 1994). He later served for six years as president of the Carlton Football Club.

Nicknamed Sticks, Kernahan was the captain of Carlton's Team of the Century and holds the club goal kicking record of 738 and, until eclipsed by Joel Selwood in 2022, held the AFL record for the most games as a club captain.

Glenelg
Stephen Kernahan is the son of South Australian football legend and Glenelg club champion and administrator Harry Kernahan, and the older brother of former Glenelg and Carlton player David Kernahan. He began his senior career with Glenelg in the South Australian National Football League (SANFL) in 1981 and played 116 games, kicking 266 goals (also playing 20 games and kicking 24 goals in night series/pre-season competition), and also won three straight best and fairest awards.

Under the coaching of 1961 Magarey Medallist John Halbert, Kernahan was a member of Glenelg's losing Grand Final teams to Port Adelaide in 1981 and Norwood in 1982.

In 1983 he topped the voting in the Magarey Medal with a then record 44 votes, made all the more remarkable as Glenelg only won 9 of 22 games for the season (after losing their first 8 games), half the number won by premiers West Adelaide. Unfortunately, he was ineligible due to being reported for an incident with Norwood's Garry McIntosh in Round 4 and was suspended for Round 5. Due to the rules of the SANFL, any player who receives a suspension during a season is ineligible to win the Medal and the award was won by North Adelaide's Tony Antrobus who polled 35 votes. Kernahan was also twice leading goal kicker for The Bays, in 1983 and 1984 and in 1985 he was awarded the Jack Oatey Medal as best on ground in the club's premiership win over North Adelaide.

In his days with Glenelg, Kernahan was mostly used as a ruckman / forward due to his 6'5" (196 cm) height and his strong marking and leading ability. He played mostly at Full-forward and was the Tigers second ruckman behind Bays legend Peter Carey. This would lead him to being Glenelg's leading goal kicker in both 1983 and 1984. His height and his slight build led to the nickname "Sticks".

Kernahan was signed by Carlton in the Victorian Football League (VFL) in 1981, but he didn't move to the club until 1986 due to his ambition to play in a premiership with his best mates at Glenelg. The anticipation of Kernahan's arrival was heightened when he played State of Origin games for South Australia and his outstanding play, usually at full-forward, saw those in Victoria take notice. In 1983, Kernahan was a member of the South Australian side which defeated Victoria in Adelaide for the first time in 18 years. He kicked 10 goals in a losing side against Victoria at Football Park in Adelaide in 1984, winning the Fos Williams Medal as South Australia's player of the match. He was a mainstay of the South Australian state of origin teams throughout his careers at Glenelg and Carlton, playing a total of sixteen games for the Croweaters, winning a second Fos Williams Medal in 1988, and captaining the team in 1996.

Carlton
After winning the 1985 premiership with Glenelg, Kernahan finally moved to Melbourne to join Carlton in 1986, the same year as two other quality South Australian players, Craig Bradley from Port Adelaide and Peter Motley from Sturt joined The Blues and the three were immediately influential for the Blues. Playing primarily at centre half-forward, and sometimes at full-forward throughout his career, Kernahan kicked 62 goals in his first season at Carlton, to be the club's leading goalkicker for the first of a club record eleven consecutive occasions.

In only his second season at the club, Kernahan was made club captain. He became widely regarded for his leadership as captain, with former club chief executive Ian Collins describing him as "on and off the field, the greatest leader [Carlton] has ever had". He held the captaincy for eleven years until his retirement, and his 226 games as captain is a VFL/AFL record for any club. In the final round of the 1987 season, he famously kicked a goal after the final siren to defeat North Melbourne and clinch the minor premiership and the bye in the first week of the finals, and Carlton went on from that position to win the Grand Final against  and its 15th premiership. Kernahan won his first of three club best and fairest awards that season.

Over the following few years, Kernahan won another two club best and fairest awards in 1989 and 1992, and continued to win the club goalkicking annually, with his highest total of 83 goals coming in 1992. He was selected in the All-Australian team in 1992 and 1994. He led Carlton to the 1993 Grand Final against , which the club lost badly despite Kernahan's seven goals. Two years later, Kernahan led the club to the 1995 premiership, kicking five goals in the Grand Final against .

Kernahan retired at the end of the 1997 season. In that year, he passed Harry Vallence to become the leading career goalkicker in Carlton Football Club history; he finished his VFL/AFL career with 738 goals, which remains a Carlton record as of 2018.

Statistics
 

|- style="background-color: #EAEAEA"
! scope="row" style="text-align:center" | 1986
|
| 4 || 25 || 62 || 27 || 233 || 95 || 328 || 157 ||  || 60 || 2.5 || 1.1 || 9.3 || 3.8 || 13.1 || 6.3 ||  || 2.4 || 1
|- 
|style="text-align:center;background:#afe6ba;"|1987†
|
| 4 || 24 || 73 || 50 || 275 || 89 || 364 || 177 || 41 || 33 || 3.0 || 2.1 || 11.5 || 3.7 || 15.2 || 7.4 || 1.7 || 1.4 || 14
|- style="background-color: #EAEAEA"
! scope="row" style="text-align:center" | 1988
|
| 4 || 23 || 54 || 36 || 288 || 71 || 359 || 161 || 28 || 30 || 2.3 || 1.6 || 12.5 || 3.1 || 15.6 || 7.0 || 1.2 || 1.3 || 3
|- 
! scope="row" style="text-align:center" | 1989
|
| 4 || 22 || 59 || 40 || 298 || 64 || 362 || 180 || 28 || 39 || 2.7 || 1.8 || 13.5 || 2.9 || 16.5 || 8.2 || 1.3 || 1.8 || 9
|- style="background-color: #EAEAEA"
! scope="row" style="text-align:center" | 1990
|
| 4 || 22 || 69 || 42 || 254 || 58 || 312 || 165 || 36 || 42 || 3.1 || 1.9 || 11.5 || 2.6 || 14.2 || 7.5 || 1.6 || 1.9 || 4
|- 
! scope="row" style="text-align:center" | 1991
|
| 4 || 20 || 46 || 36 || 234 || 57 || 291 || 149 || 36 || 36 || 2.3 || 1.8 || 11.7 || 2.9 || 14.6 || 7.5 || 1.8 || 1.8 || 6
|- style="background-color: #EAEAEA"
! scope="row" style="text-align:center" | 1992
|
| 4 || 22 || 83 || 50 || 278 || 74 || 352 || 165 || 20 || 76 || 3.8 || 2.3 || 12.6 || 3.4 || 16.0 || 7.5 || 0.9 || 3.5 || 8
|- 
! scope="row" style="text-align:center" | 1993
|
| 4 || 18 || 68 || 42 || 216 || 57 || 273 || 140 || 23 || 30 || 3.8 || 2.3 || 12.0 || 3.2 || 15.2 || 7.8 || 1.3 || 1.7 || 8
|- style="background-color: #EAEAEA"
! scope="row" style="text-align:center" | 1994
|
| 4 || 23 || 82 || 51 || 237 || 96 || 333 || 160 || 24 || 49 || 3.6 || 2.2 || 10.3 || 4.2 || 14.5 || 7.0 || 1.0 || 2.1 || 5
|- 
|style="text-align:center;background:#afe6ba;"|1995†
|
| 4 || 17 || 63 || 40 || 172 || 42 || 214 || 121 || 18 || 16 || 3.7 || 2.4 || 10.1 || 2.5 || 12.6 || 7.1 || 1.1 || 0.9 || 8
|- style="background-color: #EAEAEA"
! scope="row" style="text-align:center" | 1996
|
| 4 || 19 || 56 || 34 || 172 || 36 || 208 || 108 || 13 || 15 || 2.9 || 1.8 || 9.0 || 1.9 || 10.9 || 5.7 || 0.7 || 0.8 || 1
|- 
! scope="row" style="text-align:center" | 1997
|
| 4 || 16 || 23 || 23 || 146 || 36 || 182 || 76 || 17 || 20 || 1.4 || 1.4 || 9.1 || 2.3 || 11.4 || 4.8 || 1.1 || 1.3 || 0
|- class="sortbottom"
! colspan=3| Career
! 251
! 738
! 471
! 2803
! 775
! 3578
! 1759
! 284
! 446
! 2.9
! 1.9
! 11.2
! 3.1
! 14.3
! 7.0
! 1.3
! 1.8
! 67
|}

Honours
Overall, Kernahan played a total of 367 premiership games for Glenelg and Carlton, and kicked 1004 goals, which is the 13th most in elite Australian rules football.

Kernahan also played 20 pre-season/night series matches for Glenelg, kicking 24 goals, 16 State of Origin matches for South Australia, kicking 66 goals, and 19 pre-season/night series matches for Carlton (which are counted as senior by the SANFL but not by the VFL/AFL), kicking 39 goals. If these are included, Kernahan played 422 career senior games and kicked a career senior total of 1133 goals, which is the eighth most in elite Australian rules football.

Kernahan also played three International Rules matches for Australia in 1984 which are counted as senior by the VFL/AFL, who list Kernahan's total as 406 career senior games, excluding his pre-season/night series matches for Carlton: if these are included here, this gives Kernahan an overall total of 425 career senior games.

He was selected as an All-Australian five times: three times when the team was selected based on interstate carnival performances (1985, 1986 and 1988) and twice when the team was selected based on AFL performances (1992 and 1994). He is a Carlton and AFL life member, and has been inducted into the Australian Football Hall of Fame and the South Australian Football Hall of Fame.

Kernahan is regarded as one of the greatest players in Carlton Football Club history. He was centre half-forward and captain of the club's Team of the Century, he was made a Legend of the Carlton Football Club Hall of Fame in 1997, and as part of the club's sesquicentennial celebrations in 2014 he was named the second-greatest player in the club's history, behind only John Nicholls.

Sports Administration career
After retiring as a player, Kernahan joined the Carlton Football Club's Board of Directors, and in 2006 became a vice-president of the club. Following Graham Smorgon's failure to be re-elected at the 2007 Board Elections, Kernahan was made interim president, acquiring the services of and relinquishing the position to Richard Pratt within days. On 20 June 2008, he again took the role of president, this time permanently, after Pratt stood aside to fight charges of giving false and misleading evidence to an Australian Competition & Consumer Commission. Kernahan served as president for six years before stepping aside in June 2014. Kernahan then handed over his position as President of the club to Mark LoGiudice.

References

External links
 
 
 Stephen Kernahan Profile in Blueseum
 SANFL Hall of Fame

1963 births
Living people
All-Australians (1953–1988)
Carlton Football Club players
Carlton Football Club Premiership players
Glenelg Football Club players
Australian Football Hall of Fame inductees
South Australian State of Origin players
John Nicholls Medal winners
Carlton Football Club administrators
Australian rules footballers from Adelaide
All-Australians (AFL)
South Australian Football Hall of Fame inductees
Australia international rules football team players
Two-time VFL/AFL Premiership players